Babylonian cosmology may refer to:

Babylonian mythology
Babylonian astronomy: Cosmology